Hollingwood is a small village approximately four miles north east of Chesterfield, Derbyshire, England.

Description
Hollingwood and Barrow Hill were built in c.1900 when the Staveley Coal and Iron Company formed and built homes there for the workers. It is alleged that Hollingwood was the first village in the country to have hot running water via a ring main from a central boiler house in the village. This boiler house was shut down in the very early 1980s when gas and electric boilers became readily available.

It is surrounded by Brimington (where the population is included), Barrow Hill, and Inkersall. Between Barrow Hill and Hollingwood runs the Chesterfield Canal which is currently being regenerated by the Chesterfield Canal Trust. The canal house at Hollingwood has been renovated as a visitor centre and a very popular cafe, as well as being the headquarters of the Trust. The remains of the entrance to the Hollingwood Common Canal, originally a navigable adit, can still be seen close to the village.

Between Hollingwood and Inkersall is Ringwood Park, this houses a fishing lake, BMX bike track and a small play park. At the top of the park is Ringwood Hall which was built by the Markham family for the management of Staveley Works. During the early eighties when the works started declining and management numbers fell it was opened up to lesser ranked workers to keep money coming in. However membership was strictly by committee only and members had to be approved. It is now open for wedding functions and has a number of rooms for rent. It also has a gym and pool which can be used by the public.

It has a pub called the Hollingwood formerly known as the Hollingwood Hotel, this has a bowling green located at the rear of the pub. The BRSA club on Station Road is now in a state of ruin, more commonly known as the 'Railway Club' this closed in 2015. It did have another club called the 'Trough Lees', formerly known as the Lees Buildings, but this has now been demolished and at the moment the land lies in ruin. On the same road as the 'Trough Lees' is a working farm currently still in operation. It also houses a 'tack' shop which sells horse, dog, cat and bird food and supplies. Farm produce can be bought from the farm as well such as eggs, potatoes and other implements. Also local residents who have horses keep them there.

The day centre on Station Road, where people with learning disabilities could attend on a daily basis, has now closed (2016) and has been demolished; a new housing estate has been built on the site.

It used to have a church called St. Francis Church on Cedar Street, but this is now a set of flats.

It has a primary school called Hollingwood Primary School, which opened as a new build; the old original school has now been demolished. The village did have a secondary school, which was called Westwood Lower School (previously Hollingwood Senior Girls School); it used to school ages 11–14. Westwood Upper School was located in nearby Brimington and used to school ages 14–16. The school was closed in 1992 and the land was sold off for housing to Barratts the housebuilders. The school's football field remained untouched and is now used for Sunday League football and events that are hosted by the Hollingwood public house.

The local post office closed in November 2008 and the space left by it is currently waiting for planning permission to be granted to be turned into an Indian takeaway. However, the other local shop has now reopened (Mar 2009) and seems to be flourishing. It is neighboured by a Pizza Shop (Hollingwood Express) and a Chinese takeaway (Happiness House).
Opposite these shops is the Jehovah's Witnesses Hall and alongside it is a small play park with 4 swings, a slide and a climbing frame alongside a grassed area.

In 2009, resident Colette Daffin was murdered by husband Christopher Daffin via hit and run; Daffin was later arrested sentenced to 25 years' imprisonment after it was discovered he had taken out a life insurance policy and had been having an affair with another woman.

References

Villages in Derbyshire
Chesterfield, Derbyshire